Various special elections for the Alabama House of Representatives and Alabama Senate have been held in the U.S. state of Alabama on various dates in 2021.

State elections

Legislative

House of Representatives 33rd district special election

Democratic candidates
The Democratic primary for Alabama's 33rd house district was cancelled. Fred Crum advanced to the general election by default

Withdrawn or disqualified candidates
Terra Foster

Republican candidates
The Republican primary for Alabama's 33rd house district was cancelled. Ben Robbins advanced to the general election by default

Withdrawn or disqualified candidates
Jimmy Reynolds Jr.

Results

Senate 26th district special election

Senate 14th district special election

House of Representatives 73rd district special election

House of Representatives 78th district special election

The 2021 Alabama's 78th state house district special election took place on September 7, 2021, to elect a member to the Alabama House of Representatives to fill the vacancy left by Kirk Hatcher, who was elected to the Alabama State Senate in a special election in March. Primaries took place on May 25, 2021. The election was won by Democrat Kenyatté Hassell, who defeated Republican Loretta Grant with over 80% of the vote.

On March 8, 2021, Alabama governor Kay Ivey set a special election date and candidate filing deadlines for the 78th state house district.

Alabama's 78th state house district is situated within Montgomery County, Alabama and represents south, west, and north Montgomery, Alabama.

The 78th state house district is considered a Democratic stronghold, having voting for Democratic candidates by wide margins in recent elections, and with no Republican candidate appearing on the ballot in the 2018 election.

Democratic candidates

Nominee 
 Kenyatté Hassell, urban director for Young Life

Eliminated in primary runoff 
 Donald Williams, retired human resources consultant

Eliminated in primary 
 Terance Dawson
 Roderick Thornton

Republican candidates
The Republican primary for Alabama's 78th house district was cancelled. Loretta Grant advanced to the general election by default.

Results

References

 
Alabama